Juanita Ángeles (born 1900) was a Filipina silent film actress, noted as a major female silent star of early cinema of the Philippines.

Ángeles portrayed many leading roles. She was often paired with major silent film actors, including  Julián Manansala,  Marcelino Ilagan,  Fernando Poe, Sr.,  and Ben Rubio.

Angeles stopped making movies before World War II struck the city of Manila. She never returned to her former life's work.

Filmography

1923 –Hoy O Nunca Besame
1925 –Miracles of Love
1925 –The Filipino Woman
1929 –Ang Mutya ng Pamilihan
1930 –Maria Luisa
1932 -Ang Gayuma
1932 –Ang Magpapawid
1934 -Krus na Bato
1934 -Sawing Palad
1935 -Kalbario
1935 -Sumpa ng Aswang
1936 -Hagase tu Voluntad
1937 -Nang Magulo ang Maynila
1938 -Biyaya ni Bathala  [Filippine]
1939 -Ang Magsasampaguita  [Sampaguita]
1940 -Prinsesa ng Kumintang  [Lvn]
1940 -Lambingan  [Sampaguita] PinoyFlix.
1941 -Sa Iyong Kandungan  [Sampaguita]

References

External links
 

Filipino film actresses
1900 births
Year of death missing